Horseball is a sport played on horseback where a ball is handled and goals are scored by shooting it through a hoop with a diameter of 1m. The sport is a combination of polo, rugby, netball, and basketball.  It is one of the ten disciplines officially recognized by the International Federation for Equestrian Sports.

Origins

The sport's predecessor, pato, originated in Argentina in the early 1700s. It was outlawed in 1790 due to high mortality among players. In 1941 the Federacion Argentina de Pato was created. In 1953 was declared as Argentina's national game. The name of the game "pato" derives from the use of a live duck instead of the six-handled ball which is used in the modern sport. The game as it is known today, including the use of a ball instead of an animal, was defined in the 1930s. It gained success and has spread across Europe and overseas. The International Horseball Federation has eighteen members including eight outside of Europe: Algeria, Argentina, Australia, Brazil, Canada, China, Kyrgyzstan and Mexico.

Rules of play

The basic rules involve a team of 4 players (plus 2 substitutes if necessary) making a minimum of 3 passes between 3 different players of their team and then scoring a goal through a vertical hoop goal. The game is played on a soft, non slip surface, usually sand. The pitch is rectangular, approximately 65m x 25m.

A match begins with a pick up, the rules for the first pick up are simple; the horse has to be cantering (or at a trot when the teams are of a much younger category, usually when the players are less than 13 years of age).
The opposing team can defend by preventing them from being able to score by either pushing opponents out of the playing area using their horse's weight or by getting alongside a player and grabbing the ball from the attacker. In this situation, each rider must remain seated in the saddle; if a player leaves the saddle they will give away a penalty. If both stay seated and the defender manages to keep hold of the ball for 3 seconds then their team earns a penalty.

Simple tactics of the game involve the attacking team going towards goal crossing paths as this method helps to manoeuvre the defence and create space for attacking team members to take advantage of. Players can return 'home' if they feel an attack is failing and can cross past each other offloading the ball to form another attack. This method is quite often used because a defender trying to get the ball will usually follow the player with the ball and are no longer a threat once the ball has been passed and is travelling in the opposite direction.

When the ball is dropped or falls to the ground, anyone can pick it up so long as they are travelling in the same direction as play was when the ball was dropped. This is to avoid any riders coming head on whilst someone is picking up and to prevent a collision. Whilst picking the ball up during the game the player must not come to a stand still.

International competitions

There are several international competitions organized by the International Horse-Ball Federation: the European Championship, the World Championship, and the clubs FIHB Champions League

The European Senior Championship is the older international tournament, the first was in 1992 in Paris. This is a mixed-sex teams tournament. There have been seventeen editions of this tournament with Saint-Lô 2013 (France), being the latest.
France is the only national team to have won this tournament, the Portuguese team has the most Silver, and Belgium the most Bronze. Currently the titles are: Gold for France, Silver for Spain and Bronze for Portugal.
 
The European Lady Championship is the female only tournament, the first was in 2003 in Abano Terme 2003 (Italy). 
There have been eight editions of this tournament with Saint-Lô 2013 (France), being the latest.
France is again the only national team to have won this tournament, tied for most silver are Belgium, Germany and Spain, and tied with the most bronze are Belgium, Great Britain and Spain. Currently the titles are: Gold for France, Silver for Spain and Bronze for Belgium.

The European Under-16 Championship is the youth tournament with mixed-sex teams, the first was in 2004 in Lamotte-Beuvron 2004 (France). 
There have been ten editions of this tournament with Saint-Lô 2013 (France), being the latest.
France have been beaten to the gold twice by Spain in this tournament but still have the most golds. Spain have most silver and Italy have most bronze. Currently the titles are: Gold for France, Silver for Portugal and Bronze for Spain.

The World Championship (senior mixed teams), has been held twice.
The first was at Ponte de Lima in 2008. The teams that played in the championship were Argentina, Austria, Belgium, Brazil, Canada, France, Germany, Great Britain, Italy, Portugal, Spain. This was won by France, Spain got Silver, and Portugal Bronze. The second edition was held in 2012 in Montpellier and the team competing were, Algeria, Argentina, Belgium, France, Great Britain, Portugal, Spain. The results were France with Gold, Spain got Silver, and Portugal Bronze.

The club level competition organized by the International Horseball Federation is the FIHB Chambions League. This is competed between the top club from the four highest ranked European nations. This competition began in 2007 in Stockholm, Sweden, and was won by Chambly Horse-Ball (from France), the Portuguese team Sporting Clube de Portugal CEJC got Silver and Caramel from Belgium got Bronze. There have been 7 editions of this competition and

In 2010 was held in Portugal the first Four Nations Cup won by the National French team, Portugal got silver and Spain got bronze.

See also
 Pato, an earlier Argentine sport from which horseball is derived

References

External links
 International Horseball Federation
 Deutscher Horseball Verband
 Horseball Portugal (Portuguese Equestrian Federation)
 Belgian horse-ball team
 British Horseball Association
 Australian Horseball Association

Equestrian team sports
Team sports
Ball games
Forms of basketball
Articles containing video clips
FEI-recognized competition